Die Insel (in English "The Island") was a German literary and art magazine that was published in Munich from 1899 to 1901 by Otto Julius Bierbaum, Alfred Walter Heymel, and Rudolf Alexander Schröder.

Despite its short life, it is considered one of the most important German literary magazines of early modernism. The magazine published texts from already well-known authors like Hugo von Hofmannsthal and Rainer Maria Rilke as well as from new voices like Robert Walser.

The symbol of the magazine, a sailing boat, was designed by Peter Behrens. It is still the logo of the Insel Verlag publishing company, which arose from the magazine.

Authors 
 Otto Julius Bierbaum
 Max Dauthendey
 Richard Dehmel
 Hugo von Hofmannsthal
 Arno Holz
 Maurice Maeterlinck
 Rainer Maria Rilke
 Paul Scheerbart
 August Strindberg
 Robert Walser
 Frank Wedekind

References

 Bierbaum, Otto Julius, Heymel, Alfred Walter, Schröder, Rudolf Alexander (Hg.): Die Insel. Monatsschrift mit Buchschmuck und Illustrationen. Faksimileausgabe in zwölf Bänden mit einem Begleitband Die ersten Jahre des Insel Verlags. 1899 - 1902 von Klaus Schöffling, Frankfurt 1981
 Kurt Ifkovits: Die Insel. Eine Zeitschrift der Jahrhundertwende. Dissertation,  Vienna, 1997

1899 establishments in Germany
1901 disestablishments in Germany
Defunct literary magazines published in Germany
German-language magazines
Magazines established in 1899
Magazines disestablished in 1901
Magazines published in Munich
Visual arts magazines published in Germany